Rugby Club Walferdange, known as "De Renert", is a francophone rugby union club, based in Walferdange, in central Luxembourg.  Luxembourg has no domestic league of its own, so De Renert plays in the German Regional Leagues.

Walferdange is the second Luxembourg rugby club alongside Rugby Club Luxembourg.  The club was founded in 1990.

See also
 Luxembourg national rugby union team
 Luxembourg Rugby Federation
 Rugby union in Luxembourg
 Luxembourg women's national rugby union team

Clubs
 Rugby Club Luxembourg

Footnotes

Walferdange
Walferdange